Lars Gunnar Georg Svensson (born 30 March 1941) is a Swedish ornithologist, who received an honorary degree from the Uppsala University in 2004. He specialises in the identification of passerine birds. In 2008 he published a paper on the poorly known large-billed reed-warbler (Acrocephalus orinus) which "dramatically changed ornithological perception of the Large-billed Reed Warbler".

Selected publications
 Collins Bird Guide, with Peter J. Grant, Killian Mullarney and Dan Zetterström
 Identification Guide to European Passerines

References

Swedish ornithologists
Ornithological writers
Living people
1941 births